Harpyia is a moth genus in the  family Notodontidae, occurring in the Palaearctic.

Species
Harpyia asymmetria
Harpyia longipennis
Harpyia microsticta
Harpyia milhauseri
Harpyia powelli
Harpyia tokui
Harpyia umbrosa

Notodontidae
Moths of Europe